Yassin Mikari (born 9 January 1983) is a Tunisian professional footballer.

Club career
Mikari re-joined Grasshopper Club Zürich on 21 January 2007 and left for French club Sochaux in the Ligue 1 on 2 January 2009. He returned to Switzerland in July 2013 for his former club FC Luzern, signing a three-year deal. On 7 July 2014, he joined Tunisian giants Club Africain on a two-year deal.

International career
Mikari capped for Switzerland U-21 at the 2004 U-21 Euro qualifying stage. At the senior level, he was first capped for Tunisia at the 2008 Africa Cup of Nations. He also played for Tunisia in the 2010 Africa Cup of Nations in Angola.

References

External links

1983 births
Living people
Swiss people of Tunisian descent
Swiss men's footballers
Switzerland under-21 international footballers
Swiss Super League players
Swiss Challenge League players
Ligue 1 players
Grasshopper Club Zürich players
FC Luzern players
FC Sochaux-Montbéliard players
FC Winterthur players
Club Africain players
FC Schaffhausen players
Expatriate footballers in France
Association football defenders
Tunisian footballers
Tunisia international footballers
2008 Africa Cup of Nations players
2010 Africa Cup of Nations players
Footballers from Zürich